Princess Marie may refer to:

 Princess Marie of Baden (disambiguation), various princesses of the House of Zähringen
 Princess Marie Aglaë of Liechtenstein (1940-2021), wife and cousin of Prince Hans Adam II of Liechtenstein
 Princess Marie Bonaparte (1882–1962), French psychoanalyst
 Princess Marie of Denmark (born 1976), second wife of Prince Joachim of Denmark; known as Marie Cavallier before the wedding
 Princess Marie d'Orleans (disambiguation), various French princesses
 Princess Marie of Edinburgh (1875–1938), Queen of Romania
 Princess Marie Isabelle of Orléans (1848–1919), Countess of Paris
 Princess Marie Louise of Bulgaria (born 1933), daughter of Tsar Boris III and Tsaritsa Ioanna
 Princess Marie Louise of Schleswig-Holstein (1872–1956), member of the British Royal Family
 Princess Marie of Hanover (1849–1904), great-granddaughter of King George III
 Princess Marie of Hesse and by Rhine (1874–1878), youngest daughter of Princess Alice of the United Kingdom and Ludwig IV, the Grand Duke of Hesse
 Princess Marie of Hornes (1704–1736), daughter of Thomas Bruce, 3rd Earl of Elgin and Charlotte Jacqueline d' Argenteau, comtesse d'Esneux
 Princess Marie of Saxe-Weimar-Eisenach (disambiguation), multiple people

See also

 Princess Marie-Adélaïde of Savoy (1685–1712), Princess of Savoy and Sardinia, eldest daughter of Victor Amadeus II of Sardinia
 Princess Marie-Antoinette of Parma (1774–1841), Princess of Parma, daughter of Duke Ferdinand I of Parma
 Marie-Chantal, Crown Princess of Greece, wife of Pavlos, Crown Prince of Greece 
 Princess Marie-Christine of Belgium (born 1951) daughter of King Leopold III of the Belgians
 Princess Mary (disambiguation)
 Princess Louise-Marie (disambiguation)
 Princess Maria (disambiguation)